Aster Jan Vranckx (born 4 October 2002) is a Belgian professional footballer who plays as a midfielder for  club AC Milan, on loan from Bundesliga club VfL Wolfsburg.

Club career
On 3 December 2018, Vranckx signed his first professional contract with KV Mechelen. Vranckx made his debut for Mechelen in the 2019 Belgian Super Cup, in a 3–0 loss to Genk. Vranckx announced on 9 December 2020 that he chose to play for VfL Wolfsburg after the ongoing season.

On 1 September 2022, Vranckx joined Milan on a season-long loan, with an option to buy.

International career
Born in Belgium to a Belgian father and Congolese mother. He is a youth international for Belgium.

Career statistics

References

External links
 Mechelen Profile
 
 

2002 births
People from Kortenberg
Footballers from Flemish Brabant
Living people
Belgian footballers
Association football midfielders
Belgium youth international footballers
Belgium under-21 international footballers
Belgian people of Democratic Republic of the Congo descent
K.V. Mechelen players
VfL Wolfsburg players
A.C. Milan players
Belgian Pro League players
Bundesliga players
Belgian expatriate footballers
Expatriate footballers in Germany
Belgian expatriate sportspeople in Germany
Expatriate footballers in Italy
Belgian expatriate sportspeople in Italy